is a style of karate originating in Japan. It is a style of stand-up fighting and is rooted in a philosophy of self-improvement, discipline, and hard training.

Kyokushin Kaikan is the martial arts organization founded in 1964 by Korean-Japanese , officially the International Karate Organization. Previously, this institution was known as the Oyama Dojo. Since 1964, the style has continued to spread to more than 120 countries, becoming one of the largest martial arts organizations in the world, and in Japan itself.

History

Founding 
Initially, Masutatsu Oyama had opened his first official dōjō - the Oyama Dojo - in 1953, in a small building behind Rikkyo University to teach Goju-ryu style of traditional Karate. Subsequently, Oyama's Karate theory would deviate from Goju-ryu and would form into his own style. His instruction was distinguished by goals improving the strength in the actual battle by performing a kumite that directly hits the opponent's body with a thrust or kick. This was unlike the other schools of Karate at the time. Over the next ten years, Oyama built his organization and demonstrated his karate around the world to spread it.

Around 1956, Oyama would rename his school the "Oyama Dojo". In early days of the dojo, Oyama would not take the duty of teaching newer students. Instead,  (a Shotokan teacher from Gakushuin University Karatedo Club), Masashi Ishibashi, Ichiro Minamimoto (both Goju-ryu practitioners from Karatedo Club of Nihon University) and others would teach the newcomers to Oyama's dojo. Later, Kenji Kurosaki also became a teacher in the school.

On December 6, 1959,  was the first person to practice at the Oyama Dojo that was granted a black belt (first dan), and was listed as the first in the official yearly promotion register of the Kyokushin Kaikan.

In April 1964, Mas Oyama established the 'International Karate Organization Kyokushin kaikan' (commonly abbreviated to IKO or IKOK) under the umbrella of the Kyokushin Scholarship Foundation. Upon formation, Eisaku Sato acted as chairman and Matsuhei Mori as the vice chairman, with Oyama as the director (later president). Oyama directed the organization through a period of expansion. In June of the same year, the headquarters dojo (later the general headquarters) was completed in Ikebukuro, Toshima, Tokyo.

Oyama hand-picked instructors who displayed ability in marketing the style and gaining new members. Oyama would choose an instructor to open a new dojo. The instructor would move to that town and demonstrate his karate skills in public places. After that, word of mouth would spread through the local area until the dojo had a dedicated core of students. Kyokushin sought to expand its presence with contact with other martial arts disciples, interaction with other groups, matches, assimilation of martial arts technique.

Oyama also sent instructors to other countries such as the Netherlands (Kenji Kurosaki), Australia (Mamoru Kaneko and Shigeo Kato), the United States (Miyuki Miura, Tadashi Nakamura, Shigeru Oyama and Yasuhiko Oyama), Great Britain (Steve Arneil), Canada (Tatsuji Nakamura) and Brazil (Seiji Isobe) to spread Kyokushin in the same way. Many students, including Steve Arneil, Jon Bluming, and Howard Collins, traveled to Japan to train with Oyama directly. Kyokushin also sought to develop a close connection with VIPs and celebrities, focusing on a mass media strategy to increase fans and gain students.

In 1969, Oyama staged The First All-Japan Full Contact Karate Open Championships and Terutomo Yamazaki became the first champion. All-Japan Championships have been held at every year. In 1975, The First World Full Contact Karate Open Championships were held in Tokyo.

Kyokushin Karate would develop notoriety as "Kenka Karate" or "Brawling Karate", a moniker Oyama disliked.

At its peak, Oyama was alive in the 1990s, with branches set up in each prefecture, with more than 1,000 official branch dojos in 123 countries around the world, and a scale of 12 million members.

Splintering organizations 
Even before Mas Oyama's death in 1994, there have been several organizations that broke off from Oyama's IKO. In 1980, the Dutch Kyokushin instructor Jon Bluming would exit the IKO organization to establish the BKK (Budo Kai Kan) in 1980. In 1991, Steve Arneil lead exodus of British Karate Kyokushinkai from IKO, to establish IFK - the International Federation of Karate.

The IKO crisis 

In April 1994, Oyama died of lung cancer at the age of 70 without naming a successor, leaving Akiyoshi Matsui in charge of the IKO. This has brought much political and economic turmoil to the Kyokushin worldwide, leading to fragmentation of the organization at the national and international level.

After Mas Oyama's death, the International Karate Organization (IKO) split into two groups, primarily due to personal conflicts over who should succeed Oyama as chairman. One group led by Shokei Matsui became known as IKO-1, and a second group led by Yukio Nishida and Sanpei became was known as IKO-2. The will was proven to be invalid in the family Court of Tokyo in 1995.

There were claims that near the end of his life, Oyama named Matsui (then ranked 5th dan, and clearly junior in rank to several senior instructors) to succeed him in leading the IKO. However this claim has been disputed with Oyama's family and Matsui himself.

At present there are now several IKO organizations, such as IKO1 (Shokei Matsui), IKO2 Shinkyokushinkai (Kenji Midori), IKO3 (Y. Matsushima), IKO4 (T. Tezuka).

Techniques and training 
Kyokushin Karate training consists of three main elements: technique, forms, and sparring. These are sometimes referred to as the three "K's" after the Japanese words for them: kihon (basics), kata (formalized sequences of combat techniques), and kumite (sparring).

Kata 

Kata is a form of ritualized self-training in which patterned or memorized movements are done in order to practice a form of combat maneuverings. According to a highly regarded Kyokushin text, "The Budo Karate of Mas Oyama" by Cameron Quinn, long time interpreter to Oyama, the kata of Kyokushin are classified into Northern and Southern Kata.

The northern kata stems from the Shuri-te tradition of karate, and are drawn from Shotokan karate which Oyama learned while training under Gichin Funakoshi. The southern kata stems from the Naha-te tradition of karate, and are mostly drawn from Goju-ryu karate, which Oyama learned while training under So Nei Chu and Gogen Yamaguchi. One exception may be the kata "Yantsu" which possibly originates with Motobu-ha Shito-ryu. There is also Ura Kata - Several kata are also done in "ura", which essentially means all moves are done in mirrored form. The ura, or 'reverse' kata, were developed by Oyama as an aid to developing balance and skill in circular techniques against multiple opponents.

Sparring (kumite) 
Sparring, also called kumite, is used to train the application of the various techniques within a fighting situation. Sparring is usually an important part of training in most Kyokushin organizations, especially at the upper levels with experienced students.

In most Kyokushin organizations, hand and elbow strikes to the head or neck are prohibited. However, kicks to the head, knee strikes, punches to the upper body, and kicks to the inner and outer leg are permitted. In some Kyokushin organizations, especially outside of a tournament environment, gloves and shin protectors are worn. Children often wear headgear to lessen the impact of any kicks to the head. Speed and control are instrumental in sparring and in a training environment it is not the intention of either practitioner to injure his opponent as much as it is to successfully execute the proper strike. Tournament fighting under knockdown karate rules is significantly different as the objective is to down an opponent. Full-contact sparring in Kyokushin is considered the ultimate test of strength, endurance, techniques and spirit.

Self-defense 
Also known as Goshin Jitsu, the specific self-defense techniques of the style draw much of their techniques and tactics from Mas Oyama's study of Daitō-ryū Aiki-jūjutsu under Yoshida Kotaro. These techniques were never built into the formal grading system, and as karate itself grew increasingly sport-oriented, the self-defense training started to fall into obscurity. Today it is only practiced in a limited number of dojos. However, the proper Kyokushin Karate techniques are extremely effective when it comes to self-defense in any type of fight due to its full body contact fighting style.

Grading 
Colored belts have their origin in Judo, as does the training 'gi', or more correctly in Japanese, 'dōgi' or 'Keikogi'. The example below uses the rank structure used by Kyokushin Karate's West Los Angeles Branch although the order of belt colors does vary between Kyokushin groups. For example, 10th & 9th kyus in some groups wear orange belts, while in other groups they wear red belts instead. 
Kyu ranks

Dan Ranks

Competition formats 
Numerous tournaments are arranged by several Kyokushin organizations. Some of the most prestigious tournaments are: 
 Kyokushin World Tournament Open 
 Kyokushin World Cup in Weight Categories 
 Kyokushin All Japan Openweight Tournament
 Kyokushin All Japan Open in Weight Categories
 Kyokushin European Openweight Championships
 Kyokushin European Championships in Weight Categories

Internationally 

The style has international appeal with practitioners have over the last 40 years numbered more than 12 million.

United States
Bobby Lowe opened the first Kyokushin dojo outside of Japan in Hawaii in 1957. After Lowe, Oyama ordered Miyuki Miura, Tadashi Nakamura, Shigeru Oyama and Yasuhiko Oyama to establish Kyokushin Dojos in mainland United States.

United Kingdom
Kyokushin Karate was introduced to United Kingdom by Steve Arneil. Originally from Republic of South Africa, Arneil initially intended to establish his Kyokushin Dojo there, but was requested by Mas Oyama to go to the United Kingdom to help establish Kyokushin karate there. Subsequently, he and his wife traveled to London in 1965.

British Kyokushinkai Karate was founded in 1965 after the return of Steve Arneil and Bob Boulton from Japan, where they studied Kyokushinkai in the Tokyo Hombu. Thanks to the deep knowledge and efforts of Shihan Steve Arneil (now 10th dan), the British organization has achieved great success.

Canada
Kyokushin was introduced to Canada by Tats Nakamura in 1992 at Vancouver, British Columbia. There have been practitioners in Vancouver, BC, Canada since the late 70s/early 80s where it was referred to as Kyokushinkai and operated independently. Some known black belts are Tom Blaney, Andy Puusepp, and Shawn Ho.

Stu Corrigal (6th or 7th degree black belt) is the current representative in Canada for Kyokushin Karate.

Australia 
Kyokushin was introduced Mamoru Kaneko and Shigeo Kato.

Netherlands
Kyokushin was introduced to Netherlands by Jon Bluming and Kenji Kurosaki. On January 2, 1962, Jon Bluming, on behalf of Masutatsu Oyama, creates the first European karate association, called the NKA (Netherlands Karate Association). Under his leadership, the new school quickly gained strength and popularity. In the late 1970s, Jon Bluming leaves the leadership of the organization to his students, and he himself creates a new organization, Kyokushin Budokai Karate.

Kyokushin is integral part of Dutch martial arts scene, as it laid foundation for "Dutch-style Kickboxing", advocated by entities like Mejiro Gym and Chakuriki Gym.

Germany
There are various associations at national level in Germany today, including the KKD (Kyokushinkai Karate Germany) and the DKO (German Kyokushin Organization) and the IKOK-D (International Karate Organization Kyokushinkaikan Germany). These are not automatically in the IKO1 on an international level, so the IKOK-D is in the IKO1 (Kyokushinkaikan Honbu) and the DKO in the WKO/IKO2 (Midori).

Switzerland

Switzerland is significant for being the homeland of Andy Hug, regarded as one of the best Kyokushin fighters of all time.

Brazil
Kyokushin was introduced to Brazil by Seiji Isobe. Isobe had been operating a Kyokushin Dojo in Fukui, established on September 20, 1972 - when Mas Oyama offered Isobe the mission of promoting and setting up a dojo network in South America. That same year, Seiji Isobe permanently moved to Brazil and became the head of Kyokushin in South America.

IKO1 (headed by Shokei Matsui, in which Isobe represents Brazil at international level) and Seiwakai Karate (headed by Ademir da Costa) are the most prominent styles of Knockdown Karate in Brazil.

Poland
Andrzej Drewniak is credited for bringing Kyokushin to Poland. Fascinated by karate, he founded the first Polish Karate Kyokushin section at AZS in Krakow in 1972. In 1974 he became the Polish middleweight champion in kyokushin karate. In the same year he went to a training camp in the Netherlands, where he passed the 1st dan exam, becoming the first Polish holder of a black belt and the title of Kyokushin karate sensei. In 1979, he became a co-founder of the Polish Karate Association, of which he has been a long-term vice-president.

Thanks to the support of Loek Hollander, the president of the European Karate Kyokushinkai Organization, he received an annual scholarship and an invitation to Japan, but only after six years, secretly from the political and sports authorities, he managed to go to Tokyo. At the end of his stay in Japan, he obtained the 4th dan, after 15 months of training under Sosai Masutatsu Ōyama, where he was the only Polish uchideshi.

Most Kyokushin karate clubs, regardless of their affiliation to world organizations, are also concentrated in the Kyokushin Commission of the Polish Karate Association (KK PZK / Komisji Kyokushin Polskiego Związku Karate) under which inter-organizational competitions of the rank of the Polish Championships and the Macro-region Championships are held.

The "World Oyama Karate"-style, founded by Shigeru Ōyama (10th dan) - has its largest concentration of practitioners in Poland, with largest number of clubs in the world. After Shigeru Ōyama retired from the leadership of the organization, hanshi Jan Dyduch (8th dan) from Krakow became the director of the organization (OYAMA International Karate Federation), who is also the leader of the Polish organization.

Hungary
In Hungary, István Adámy and Kálmán Furkó are credited for establishing Kyokushin in the country. In 1977, István Adámy received the 1st Dan Black in Kyokushin and was appointed branch leader of Hungary by IKO. Kálmán Furkó obtained his first dan degree in 1978 and became a shihan in Szolnok in 1984.

The development of domestic Kyokushin started in 1976. By the mid-1980s, there were nearly ten thousand practitioners of Kyokushin Karate in Hungary.
Since then, Kyokushin has been one of the most popular karate styles in Hungary. István Adámy and Kálmán Furkó worked together until the political problems in IKO, following death of Mas Oyama. Since then, they have been on separate paths, but working towards the same goal.

Hungary is particular for hosting the Ibutz Oyama Cup, which was held three times between 1983 and 1986 at the National Sports Arena in Budapest. The tournament was held in three different weight classes. Kyokushin founder Masutatsu Ōyama first visited Hungary in 1983 and was also involved in overseeing the next two tournaments.

Romania

Russia
While in Poland on a business trip, Tanyushkin met Andrzej Drewniak in Krakow and began to practice karate with him. After some time, having learned about the existence of Kyokushinkai style karate, Tanyushkin and Drewnyak wrote a letter to Masutatsu Oyama and, on his instructions, began to cooperate with the President of the European Kyokushinkai Organization, Loek Hollander. Tanyushkin opened the first section of Kyokushinkai in the USSR in Moscow in 1973. By the end of the 1970s, a school had formed in the country with representatives in all major regions.

After the almost 10-year ban on karate was lifted in 1989, Tanyushkin established the Kyokushinkai Federation of the USSR. The creation of such a federation was a huge step forward for the development of martial arts in the USSR.

During the period of work of the national organization, Kyokushinkai karate entered the country's sports classification system as an official sport (1990), and development reached the international level. In 1993, the Kyokushinkai Federation of Russia was one of the first to join the new International Karate Federation (IFK), headed by Hansi Steve Arneil (now 10th dan). On behalf of IFK, on the basis of the Russian national organization, the Eurasian Committee (EAC) was created, representing IFK in the territory of the former USSR. It was headed by S. Stepanov (now 5 dan Kyokushin-kan). The Committee existed until 1998, having held 6 international class "A" tournaments during this time.

After the death of Masutatsu Oyama in 1994 and the split of the Kyokushinkai, from the late 90s, other Kyokushin Federations began to develop in Russia, representing various international organizations. Now in Russia they are working:
 Federation of Kyokushin Karate of Russia (FKKR), representing the World Shinkyokushinkai Organization, WKO, led by Kenji Midori
 Russian National Federation of Kyokushinkai Karate (RNFKK), representing the International Kyokushinkai Organization, IKO, led Shokei Matsui
 Federation of Kyokushinkaikan of Russia (FKR), representing the International Kyokushinkai Organization, IKO, led by Shokei Matsui (until 2013 - Federation of Kyokushinkai Karate of Russia)
 Russian Kyokushinkai Federation (FKR), representing the International Kyokushinkai Federation, IFK, led by Steve Arneil л
 Federation of Kyokushinkan Karate of Russia (FKKR), representing the International Organization of Kyokushinkau, KI, led by Hatsuo Royama

These five Federations are united in the Kyokushin Association of Russia, accredited by the Ministry of Sports and headed by Yu. P. Trutnev (currently Vice Prime Minister of the Government of Russia, Plenipotentiary Representative of the President of the Russian Federation in the Far East).

Some of these organizations (in particular, the Kyokushin Federation of Russia, the Russian Kyokushinkaikan Karate Union, etc.) are members of the All-Style Karate Federation of Russia. In addition, some of these organizations (in particular, the Russian Kyokushin Association, the Russian Kyokushin Karate Federation, the Russian Kyokushin Karate-do Federation, the Russian Kyokushin Federation, the Russian Kyokushin Federation, etc.) are members of the Russian Union of Martial Arts.

Lithuania
Large majority of Kyokushin Clubs in Lithuania belong to Kenji Midori's WKO Shin-Kyokushin (formerly IKO-2) organization. Currently, there are two IKO-1 clubs Samurajus in Marijampolė and IchiGeki Sports Club in Vilnius.

Bulgaria

Bulgaria is well known in the KYOKUSHIN KARATE world since two Bulgarian karatekas had proven their quality in a numerous international, European and world championships. 

Zahari Damyanov: 4 times European and absolute world champion. 
Ivanka Popova: Absolute European champion.

Spain

Singapore and SEA
Kyokushin was introduced to Singapore and of most of South East Asia by Shihan Peter Chong. Chong had established the first Kyokushin Dojo in Singapore in 1968, which was not registered with the Singapore Karate Association at the time.

Iran
Iranian Kyokushin fighters have been successful in top-level competition. In particular, Iran is highly successful in Kyokushin World Tournament Open hosted by IKO3 / Matsushima Group.

Kyokushin Organizations and derivative styles

Kyokushin Organizations
After Oyama's death, several different Kyokushin organizations began to emerge in Japan and beyond.

International Karate Organization
Internationally, the name of the original organization is carried by multiple organizations:

 IKO Mas Oyama Kyokushinkaikan (IKO Sosai Kyokushinkaikan) - an organization run by the Oyama family who inherited it from the late Mas Oyama, the founder of Kyokushin Kaikan. The European coordinator was Shihan Neagoie Horatiu (5th Dan) from Romania.
 IKO Kyokushin-kaikan / Kyokushin Matsui Group (IKO-1) - the largest and most important Kyokushin karate organization in terms of bringing together the largest number of practitioners, clubs and countries in the world. Founder and current CEO is Kancho Shokei Matsui (8th dan). The chairman of the international committee is shihan  (9th dan), members of the committee are also Seiji Isobe (8th dan) from Brazil, Kenny Uytenbogaardt (8th dan) from South Africa, and Katsuhito Gorai (7th dan) from USA.
 Kyokushin Karate Tezuka Group (IKO-4) - founded by Toru Tezuka, led by Yoshimichi Mori.
 All Japan Kyokushin Union / Kyokushin Rengōkai (IKO-5 Kyokushinkaikan) - a union of independent organizations, dojos, schools of individual shihan and sensei.
Currently, it does not belong to any organization, and is conducting its own activities in Tokyo, Kanagawa, Tochigi, Gunma, Fukui in Japan, and overseas in Vietnam, Iran, Pakistan, India, Chile, etc.
 IKO Kyokushinkaikan World So-Kyokushin (shortened to "So-Kyokushin") - led by 
 IKO World Kyokushin Kaikan -  is a general incorporated association established in 2018 by the Kyokushin Kaikan in the Kyushu area. Led by  
 IKO World Zen-Kyokushin - led by

Other major Japanese organizations
Other Japanese Kyokushin organizations that do not use the official name "IKO" and "Kyokushinkaikan".
 NPO World Karate Organization Shinkyokushinkai (aka "WKO", also formerly IKO2) - led by Kenji Midori.
 IBMA Kyokushin Kaikan Masuda Dojo - headed by Akira Masuda.
 KWU (Kyokushin World Union) ShinKyokushin - an organization founded on October 12, 2011. It was established to replace the Kyokushin-Kan Alliance founded by Hatsuo Royama. The original Kyokushin-kan was established by Hatsuo Royama following his displeasure with Shokei Matsui's leadership of IKO1. With the help of Hiroto Okazaki and others, Royama established the Kyokushin-kan International Honbu in December 2002. The goal of the organization is to follow "Kyokushin's original spirit which Oyama envisioned."
 Kyokushin Budo Karate Organization Kyokushin Kenbukai - lead by Masahiro Kaneko.

Major organizations outside Japan
 IFK (International Federation of Karate) - Established by Steve Arneil and British Karate Kyokushinkai (BKK) in 1991, following an exodus from Oyama's IKO.
 KWF (Kyokushin World Federation) - founded by Shihan Loek Hollander (10th dan) from the Netherlands, serving as the honorary president of KWF for years, who died on February 16, 2020. The current president of the organization is shihan Antonio Pinero (9th dan) from Spain, and the vice president is Hristo Traikov (7th dan) from Bulgaria. 
 IBK (International Budokai Kan) - founded by former IKO member Jon Bluming. Originally BKK (Budo Kai Kan) from 1980, the name was changed to IBK in 1996. Advocates "Kyokushin Budokai", which focuses on self-defense, with emphasis on Judo-like throws. 
 Internationale Budo Kai - headed by Gerard Gordeau (9th dan), in Poland as the Polish Federation Budokai Karate Institute (IBK) - headed by shihan Artur Więzowski (6th dan) from Ciechanowiec.
 IKAK (International Karate Alliance KyokushinRyu), founded by Peter Chong.
 IKU (International Kyokushin Union), founded by former IKO member David Farzinzad. 
 IKA (International Kyokushinkai Association), founded by former IKO member Carlos Costa.
 IKKF (International Kyokushinkai Karate Federation), founded by former IKO member Teyub Azizov.
 WKB (World Kyokushin Budokai), an organization that complies with IBK rules, is led by Pedro Roiz.
 IBKO (International Budo Karate Organization), an organization founded on November 21, 2011, led by Tomokichi Anzai.
 KKFI (Kyokushin Karate Foundation of India), an organization founded in 2013, led by Vasant Kumar Singh.

Derivative styles
Kyokushin has had an influence on many other styles:
 Ashihara Karate - founded by Hideyuki Ashihara. Places emphasis on self-defense and Tai Sabaki.
 Enshin Karate - competitive variant of Ashihara Karate, founded by Jōkō Ninomiya.
 Seidokaikan - traditional full contact karate derived from Kyokushin by Kazuyoshi Ishii. Seidokaikan organized the first professional full contact karate tournament named the Karate World Cup. The Karate World Cup had special extension rounds; if the judge's decision was deadlocked after an extension round, the rules then allowed face strikes with fighters donning boxing gloves (kickboxing). The founder would later establish the Professional Kickboxing promotion K-1.
 Seidō juku - founded by Tadashi Nakamura, the main dojo is located in New York, USA.
 Satojuku - established by Katsuaki Sato in 1977. It is a similar style to Kyokushin, but emphasizes precise knockdown techniques over techniques designed to injure or "knock-out" one's opponent. Describing his art in 1987, Satō wrote, "Odo means the way champions must behave. It is based on humane feelings and courtesy, on being honorable, on being devoid of selfishness or bias. It is the antithesis of any martial art that relies only on force to conquer an opponent."
 Shidōkan - founded by Yoshiji Soeno.
 Seiwakai - founded by Ademir da Costa, this style style is mainly based in Brazil. Seiwakai is characterized as an aggressive style, with a fighting strategy aimed at achieving victory by knockout. 
 World Oyama - established by Shigeru Oyama in the United States. The entity is currently headed by his younger brother, Yasuhiko Oyama, who operates out of Birmingham, Alabama. Has a significant presence in Poland, where the organization is headed by Hanshi Jan Dyduch (8th Dan).
 Sei Budokai - headed by Hanshi Leonardo Voinescu (8th dan Sei Budokai, 4th dan Judo) from Romania. The honorary president is hanshi Dave Jonkers (9th dan Sei Budokai, 9th dan Ashihara Karate, 5th dan Judo) from the Netherlands, and the honorary technical director is shihan Semmy Schilt (6th dan Ashihara Karate, 6th dan Sei Budokai) from Netherlands.

Kokondo is derived from Kyokushin, albeit without a strong focus on competition with the emphasis rather on realistic goshin-jutsu (self-defense). Some styles originating in Kyokushin (Jushindo, Kūdō, Zendokai) have changed to mixed martial arts rules.

Influence 

Kyokushin has influenced  other styles, especially the knockdown karate competition format. Karate styles that originated in Kyokushin, such as Ashihara Karate, Budokaido, Godokai, Enshin Karate, Seidō juku, Musokai, Shidōkan, World Oyama and Seidokaikan, are also knockdown styles and use slight variations of the competition rules.

Many  top kickboxers  such as Andy Hug, Francisco Filho and Masahiro Yamamoto-  have started in knockdown karate. The influence of Kyokushin can be seen in the K-1 kickboxing tournament that originated out of the Seidokaikan karate organization, which is an offshoot from Kyokushin.

Kyokushin is the basis of glove karate, a knockdown karate format wearing boxing gloves and allowing punches to the head. Glove karate rules are used in Kyokushin Karate Iran.

In popular culture 

Kyokushin Karate has featured in following videogames:
 The move sets of Ryu and Ken from Capcom's Street Fighter franchise are based on Kyokushin. Both character are based notable Kyokushin practitioners from late 60s/early 70s, with Ryu based on Yoshiji Soeno and Ken on Terutomo Yamazaki. The characters are influenced on the real-life counterparts' depictions in manga Karate Baka Ichidai.
 In Namco's Tekken series, Jin Kazama uses Kyokushin Karate as his fighting style, starting from Tekken 4 and subsequent titles.
 Shotaro Kadonashi and his disciples from Namco's Urban Reign use the art of Kyokushinkai.
 Hitomi from the Dead or Alive (franchise) series uses karate where many moves have roots originating from Kyokushin.
 Matsuo Shozan's Hokushinkan Karate School and his disciples' fighting style in PS2 games Garouden Breakblow (2005) and Garouden Breakblow Fist or Twist (2007) are heavily based on Kyokushinkaikan and its founder Oyama Masutatsu 'Sosai'.
 Jean Kujo, from the Virtua Fighter series, practices varied forms of full-contact karate, including Kyokushin Karate.
 Solara from Marvel Nemesis: Rise of the Imperfects is said to practice Kyokushin.
 Kyokushin Karate has served as the basis for the Kyokugenryu Karate, a fictional martial art from SNK Playmore's Art of Fighting, Fatal Fury, and King of Fighters series. Kyokugenryu (lit. "the extreme style") and Kyokushin are similar sounding names, and the family patriarch Takuma Sakazaki is modelled after Kyokusin founder Mas Oyama. Besides Takuma, characters Ryo Sakazaki, Robert Garcia, Yuri Sakazaki and Marco Rodriguez/Khushnood Butt use this style. 
 Torao Onigawara in the arcade game The Fallen Angels (video game) is a master of Kyokushin Karate.
 Ichigeki: Hagane no Hito is a 3D fighting game for the PlayStation that focuses on the International Karate Organization (also known as IKO 1). The game even features real life Kyokushin athletes of the 90's including Francisco Filho, Kazumi Hajime, Nicholas Pettas and even live video segments of IKO head Shokei Matsui.
 Karate Master Knock Down Blow a recent game from Crian Soft that is heavily based on Kyokushin Karate.

A trilogy of films starring Sonny Chiba and directed by Kazuhiko Yamaguchi were produced in Japan between 1975 and 1977: Champion of Death, Karate Bearfighter and Karate for Life. Chiba plays Master Oyama, who also appears in two of the films.

The James Bond movie You Only Live Twice, starring Sean Connery, was filmed largely in Japan and featured a karate demonstration by a number of well-known Kyokushin students, including Shigeo Kato (who introduced Kyokushin to Australia and was the original teacher of Shokei Matsui) and Akio Fujihira.

Kyokushin was featured on Fight Quest on Discovery Channel as the Japanese Martial Arts Style.

In the Korean manhwa The God of High School, Han Daewi is known for having practiced Kyokushin, and Mas Oyama appears as Oyama Sugihara's Borrowed Power.

Notable practitioners

Literature 
 Masutatsu Oyama. What Is Karate? HarperCollins (1966) ISBN 0-87040-147-5
 Masutatsu Oyama. Vital Karate. Japan Publications Trading company. Tokyo, San Francisco. 1967–1974. ISBN 0-87040-143-2
 Masutatsu Oyama. This Is Karate. Japan Publications. (1973) ISBN 0-87040-254-4
 Masutatsu Oyama. Advanced Karate. Japan Publications (2000) ISBN 0-87040-001-0
 B. Lowe. Mas Oyama's Karate. ISBN 0-668-01140-8

Notes

References

See also

 Comparison of karate styles

Kyokushin kaikan
Combat sports
Korean culture
Korean martial arts
Mixed martial arts styles